About  north of Tulum, Mexico, a new international airport was announced. In March 2011, the bidding for construction contracts was to be concluded.

As of April 2014, all projects related with the Tulum Airport were no longer available through official sites, and after the installation of Andrés Manuel López Obrador as president in 2018, emphasis was placed on the high speed trans-peninsula train, the Tren Maya.

However, in recent years plans were reinstituted and the airport is scheduled to open in April, 2024 with Viva Aerobus announced as the first carrier to operate from there.

References

Tulum